Keith Sanderson may refer to:
Keith Sanderson (footballer) (1940–2022), English footballer
Keith Sanderson (sport shooter) (born 1975), American rapid fire pistol shooter